La Laurentienne Building (French: Édifice La Laurentienne) is a , 27-story skyscraper in Montreal, Quebec, Canada.
The building was designed by Dimitri Dimakopoulos & Associates for Marathon Realty, Lavalin and the Laurentian Bank. It is located on René-Lévesque Boulevard at the intersection of Peel Street, in the Ville-Marie borough of Downtown Montreal. It is adjacent to the Bell Centre and the 1250 René-Lévesque skyscraper to the south, and stands on the site of the former Laurentian Hotel.

La Laurentienne Building is currently owned and managed by global real estate investor, developer and owner Oxford Properties. The building's grounds are home to the outdoor bronze sculpture Cactus modulaire.

Tenants
ADP Canada
BCF Business Law
Transcontinental Media

See also

 List of tallest buildings in Montreal

References

External links

Skyscrapers in Montreal
Office buildings completed in 1986
Skyscraper office buildings in Canada
Downtown Montreal
Oxford Properties
Modernist architecture in Canada